{{Automatic taxobox
|taxon = Marshallena
|image = Marshallena nierstraszi 001.jpg
|image_caption = Original image of a shell of Marshallena nierstraszi
|authority =   Allan, 1926
|synonyms_ref = 
|synonyms= Sugitanitoma Kuroda, 1959
|type_species= † Daphnella neozelanica Suter, 1917 
|subdivision_ranks = Species
|subdivision = See text
|display_parents = 3
}}Marshallena is a genus of sea snails, marine gastropod mollusks in the family Marshallenidae.

R.S. Allen (1927) didn't specify a type species for this genus. H.J. Finlay (1927) selected Belophos incertus Marshall, 1919, which was amended by Powell (1966 + 1969) to † Daphnella neozelanica Suter, 1917

Before 2018 this genus used to belong to the family Horaiclavidae.

Species
Species within the genus Marshallena include:
 † Marshallena curtata (Marwick, 1926)
 Marshallena diomedea Powell, 1969
 † Marshallena neozelanica (Suter, 1917)
 Marshallena nierstraszi (Schepman, 1913)
 Marshallena philippinarum (Watson, 1882)
Species brought into synonymy
 † Marshallena anomala Powell, 1942: synonym of † Zeatoma anomala (Powell, 1942) 
 † Marshallena austrotomoides Powell, 1931: synonym of † Zeatoma austrotomoides (Powell, 1931)
 † Marshallena carinaria Powell, 1935: synonym of † Gymnobela carinaria (Powell, 1935)
 † Marshallena celsa Marwick, 1931: synonym of † Zeatoma celsa (Marwick, 1931) (original combination)
 † Marshallena decens Marwick, 1931: synonym of † Zeatoma decens (Marwick, 1931) (original combination)
 Marshallena gracilispira Powell, 1969: synonym of Benthomangelia gracilispira (Powell, 1969)
 † Marshallena impar Powell, 1942: synonym of  † Zeatoma impar (Powell, 1942)

References

 Allen, 1927, Trans. N.Z. Inst. 57:291
 Kuroda T. (1958-1959) Descriptions of new species of marine shells from Japan. Venus, 20: 317–335 [Text, issued 1959], pl. 20-12
 Cernohorsky, Walter O. "Taxonomic notes on some deep-water Turridae (Mollusca: Gastropoda) from the Malagasy Republic." Records of the Auckland Institute and Museum (1987): 123-134.
 Powell, A.W.B. 1966. The molluscan families Speightiidae and Turridae, an evaluation of the valid taxa, both Recent and fossil, with list of characteristic species. Bulletin of the Auckland Institute and Museum. Auckland, New Zealand 5: 1-184, pls 1-23 
 Wilson, B. 1994. Australian Marine Shells. Prosobranch Gastropods''. Kallaroo, WA : Odyssey Publishing Vol. 2 370 pp.

External links
 Finlay H.J. (1926). A further commentary on New Zealand molluscan systematics. Transactions of the New Zealand Institute. 57: 320-485, pls 18-23
 Tucker, J.K. 2004 Catalog of recent and fossil turrids (Mollusca: Gastropoda). Zootaxa 682:1-1295.
 Bouchet, P.; Kantor, Y. I.; Sysoev, A.; Puillandre, N. (2011). A new operational classification of the Conoidea (Gastropoda). Journal of Molluscan Studies. 77(3): 273-308
 Abdelkrim J., Aznar-Cormano L., Fedosov A., Kantor Y., Lozouet P., Phuong M., Zaharias P. & Puillandre N. (2018). Exon-capture based phylogeny and diversification of the venomous gastropods (Neogastropoda, Conoidea). Molecular Biology and Evolution. 35(10): 2355-2374

 
Marshallenidae